Dorcadion brenskei is a species of beetle in the family Cerambycidae. It was described by Ludwig Ganglbauer in 1883. It is known from Greece.

References

brenskei
Beetles described in 1883